Elizabeth Viola Bell  (4 June 1897 – 25 December 1990) was a New Zealand teacher, sports administrator and community leader. She was born in San Francisco, California, United States, on 4 June 1897.

In the 1976 New Year Honours, Bell was awarded the British Empire Medal, for services to education, sport and cultural activities.

References

1897 births
1990 deaths
New Zealand educators
People from San Francisco
New Zealand recipients of the British Empire Medal
American emigrants to New Zealand